The Academy of Sciences of Uzbekistan is the main scientific organization of the Republic of Uzbekistan. It coordinates research in all areas of science and technology. The academy was established in 1943 as the Academy of Sciences of the Uzbek SSR. After the collapse of the USSR, it became the Academy of Sciences of Uzbekistan.

Membership 
The academy currently has 155 members, 49 academicians, and 106 corresponding members. With more than 50 scientific research institutions and organizations, the academy is the largest scientific organization in Uzbekistan.

Presidents of the Academy of Sciences of Uzbekistan
The Academy of Sciences of Uzbekistan has had thirteen presidents since its foundation. The current president is Bekhzod Yuldashev.

 Toshmuhammad Qori-Niyoziy (1943–1947)
 Toshmuhammad Aliyevich Sarimsoqov (1947–1952)
 Tesha Zohidovich Zohidov (1952–1956)
 Habib Muhammadovich Abdullayev (1956–1962)
 Ubay Arifovich Orifov (1962–1966)
 Obid Sodyqovich Sodyqov (1966–1984)
 Pulat Qirgizboyevich Habibullayev (1984–1988)
 Mahmud Salohitdinovich Salohitdinov (1988–1994)
 Jura Adbdullayevich Abdullayev (1994–1995)
 Tukhtamurod Jurayevich Jurayev (1995–2000)
 Behzod Sodiqovich Yoʻldoshev (2000–2005)
 Tohir Fotihovich Oripov (2005–2006)
 Shavkat Ismoilovich Salihov (2006–2016)
 Bekhzod Sadykovich Yuldashev (2016-present)

References

External links 
 Official website 
 Page on UzScienceNet 

 
Science and technology in Uzbekistan
USSR Academy of Sciences
1943 establishments in the Soviet Union
Scientific organizations established in 1943